Rhincalanus is a genus of crustaceans belonging to the monotypic family Rhincalanidae.

The genus has almost cosmopolitan distribution.

Species:

Rhincalanus cornutus 
Rhincalanus gigas 
Rhincalanus nasutus 
Rhincalanus rostrifrons

References

Crustaceans